Mercuria is a genus of small brackish water snails or freshwater snails with a gill and an operculum,  aquatic gastropod mollusks in the family Hydrobiidae.

Species
Species within the genus Mercuria include:

 Mercuria anatina (Poiret, 1801)
 Mercuria atlasica Mabrouki, Glöer & Taybi, 2021
 Mercuria baccinelliana Esu & Girotti, 2015 
 Mercuria bakeri Glöer, Boeters & Walther, 2015
 Mercuria balearica (Paladilhe, 1869)
 Mercuria baudoniana (Gassies, 1859)
 Mercuria bayonnensis  (Locard, 1894)
 Mercuria boetersi Schlickum & Strauch, 1979 
 Mercuria bourguignati Glöer, Bouzid & Boeters, 2010
 Mercuria corsensis Boeters & Falkner, 2017
 Mercuria gauthieri Glöer, Bouzid & Boeters, 2010
 Mercuria glaberrima (O. Boettger, 1875) 
 Mercuria globulina (Letourneux & Bourguignat, 1887)
 Mercuria helicella (F. Sandberger, 1858) 
 Mercuria letourneuxiana (Bourguignat, 1862) 
 Mercuria maceana (Paladilhe, 1869)
 Mercuria melitensis (Paladilhe, 1869)
 Mercuria meridionalis (Risso, 1826)
 Mercuria midarensis Boulaassafer, Ghamizi & Delicado, 2018
 Mercuria punica  (Letourneux & Bourguignat, 1887)
 Mercuria pycnocheilia (Bourguignat, 1862)
 Mercuria rolani Glöer, Boeters & Walther, 2015
 Mercuria saharica (Letourneux & Bourguignat, 1887)
 Mercuria sarahae (Paladilhe, 1869)  
 Mercuria similis (Draparnaud, 1805) 
 Mercuria tachoensis (Frauenfeld, 1865)
 Mercuria tensiftensis Boulaassafer, Ghamizi & Delicado, 2018
 Mercuria tingitana Glöer, Boeters & Walther, 2015
 Mercuria vanparysi Marquet et al., 2008 
 Mercuria zopissa (Paulucci, 1882)

Species brought into synonymy
 Mercuria confusa (Frauenfeld, 1863): synonym of Mercuria similis (Draparnaud, 1805)
 Mercuria edmundi Boeters, 1986: synonym of Mercuria tachoensis (Frauenfeld, 1865) (junior synonym)
 Mercuria emiliana  (Paladilhe, 1869): synonym of Pseudamnicola emilianus (Paladilhe, 1869) 
 Mercuria perforata (Bourguignat, 1862) : synonym of Pseudamnicola dupotetiana (Forbes, 1838)
 Mercuria vindilica (Paladilhe, 1870): synonym of Mercuria sarahae vindilica (Paladilhe, 1870)

References

External links 
 

Hydrobiidae